6-(Methylsulfinyl)hexyl isothiocyanate (6-MITC or 6-MSITC) is a compound within the isothiocyanate group of organosulfur compounds. 6-MITC is obtained from cruciferous vegetables, chiefly wasabi.  Like other isothiocyanates, it is produced when the enzyme myrosinase transforms the associated glucosinolate into 6-MITC upon cell injury.

It is a trend in Japan to apply freshly grated wasabi stem to the hair because Kinin Corporation, the world's largest wasabi producer, claims that 6-MITC promotes hair regrowth.

See also
 Methyl isothiocyanate

References

Isothiocyanates
Sulfoxides